Ho Chi Minh City has 21 urban and rural districts and 1 municipal city. Among them, 10 are numbered and 12 are named. This article lists the etymologies of the names of districts and municipal city in Ho Chi Minh City.

Municipal city

Urban districts

Rural districts

Footnotes

References 

Lists of place name etymologies
Geography of Ho Chi Minh City